Comox—Alberni was a federal electoral district in British Columbia, Canada, that was represented in the House of Commons of Canada from 1917 to 1979, and again from 1988 to 1993.

History

This riding was created in 1914 from parts of Comox—Atlin  riding.

It was abolished in 1976 when it was redistributed into Comox—Powell River and Nanaimo—Alberni  ridings.

It was recreated in 1987 from parts of those two ridings. The new riding consisted of:

 the Town of Comox;
 the City of Courtenay;
 Electoral Areas A, B and C of Comox-Strathcona Regional District;
 the Alberni-Clayoquot Regional District;
 Electoral Areas E, F, G and H of Nanaimo Regional District;
 that part of Electoral Area C of Nanaimo Regional District lying west of the east boundary of Dunsmuir Land District;
 Electoral Area E of Powell River Regional District;
 the Village of Cumberland; and
 the Towns of Parksville and Qualicum Beach.

The electoral district was abolished in 1996 when it was merged into Nanaimo—Alberni riding.

Members of Parliament

Election results

Comox—Alberni, 1988–1993

Comox—Alberni, 1917–1974

See also 

 List of Canadian federal electoral districts
 Past Canadian electoral districts

External links

Riding history from the Library of Parliament:
1914 - 1976
1987 - 1996

Defunct British Columbia federal electoral districts on Vancouver Island